Central Township is one of eleven townships in Merrick County, Nebraska, United States. The population was 62 at the 2020 census. A 2021 estimate placed the township's population at 62.

See also
County government in Nebraska

References

External links
City-Data.com

Townships in Merrick County, Nebraska
Townships in Nebraska